Josh Casarona (born April 12, 1992 in Columbus, Georgia) is an American soccer player who most recently played for Atlanta Silverbacks in the North American Soccer League.

Career

Youth and Amateur
Casarona spent his youth soccer career playing for CFC Red Star in Columbus, Georgia. He left the United States to play in Argentina at the age of 16. As part of Alabama’s ODP program, he played in tournaments against teams from Mexico, Argentina and England. He played at the CEFAR Soccer School in Buenos Aires, Argentina, as well as playing for the US U-20 ODP Region III team in a tournament at Chelsea F.C.

Professional
Casarona signed to play with Atlanta Silverbacks in the North American Soccer League on April 6, 2011. His first cap was on July 4, 2011 in a home loss to Puerto Rico Islanders. Atlanta released Casarona on December 2, 2011.

References

External links
 Atlanta Silverbacks bio

1992 births
Living people
American soccer players
Atlanta Silverbacks players
North American Soccer League players
Association football defenders